Double Dog Dare may refer to:
"Double Dog Dare", a 2002 episode of Teacher's Pet
"Double Dog Dare", a 2012 episode of Judge John Hodgman
Double Dog Dare, a 1988 children's book by Jamie Gilson
Double Dog Dare, a 2012 children's book by Lisa Graff

See also
Doubledogdare (1953–1974), American Thoroughbred Champion racehorse